Garsdale is a railway station in Cumbria, England (historically in the West Riding of Yorkshire), on the Settle and Carlisle Line, which runs between  and  via . It is owned by Network Rail and managed by Northern Trains.

History
The station was designed by the Midland Railway company architect John Holloway Sanders, though not in the same style as used elsewhere on the route. It opened on 1 August 1876 as Hawes Junction.

Adjoining the station are sixteen Railway Cottages built for its employees by the Midland Railway around 1876, the year the Settle-Carlisle Line opened.  A further six cottages were added near to the Moorcock Inn soon afterwards.  In the days of steam-hauled London-Scotland expresses, the locality once boasted the highest water troughs in the world (just along the line at Ling Gill). Unusually, the station waiting room was once used for Anglican church services, and the railway turntable had a wall of sleepers built around it to prevent locomotives being spun by strong winds: this happened in 1900 and was the inspiration for the story 'Tenders and Turntables' in the book 'Troublesome Engines' in The Railway Series by Rev W. Awdry.

This line was closed in March 1959, though it is the long-term aim of the Wensleydale Railway to extend their rails along the former route from Redmire to connect with services here, allowing through journeys to Northallerton on the East Coast Main Line. The signal box (opened just a few months before the Christmas 1910 accident) on the northbound platform is still in use today.

Stationmasters
The station master at Garsdale possessed water-gauges, barometers and other meteorological appliances on the western slopes above the station, and collected data a few times each day and transmitted this to the Meteorological Society in London.

H. Smith 1876 - 1880
George Wooding 1880 - 1881 
W. Foster 1881 - 1886
William Henry Bunce 1886 - 1919 (formerly station master at Horton in Ribblesdale)
J.F. Ferguson ca. 1938
Daniel May ca. 1945
Douglas Cobb ca. 1950
Cyril Breeze

Facilities
The station is unstaffed, but waiting rooms are available on each platform.  They are linked by a ramped subway and are therefore fully accessible for disabled travellers.  Tickets must be bought in advance or on the train as no ticket machines are available (though TOC Northern are intending to install one and PIS screens by 2020 as part of a wider station improvement programme). Train running information can be obtained from timetable posters or by phone from the station signal box.  A bus service to and from Hawes connects with selected train departures each day.

Signal box
The signal box, a 4c type as designed and built by the Midland Railway Company, was installed in June 1910 and is made from timber with a Welsh slate roof. It was given grade II listed status in 2013. The box was significant in the 1910 Hawes Junction crash, which led to the introduction of track circuits to prevent that type of tragedy happening again. Its heritage status was awarded partly due to its involvement in the accident. In June 2020, Network Rail applied to the Yorkshire Dales National Park Authority to carry out repairs on the decaying structure. Refurbishment began in June 2021, and is expected to take three months.

Services

Garsdale has seen a modest improvement in service levels in recent years, with an extra morning and evening service in each direction.  This brings the service level up to that seen at various other stations on the route (such as ), namely eight northbound and seven southbound trains on weekdays and Saturdays, and five each way on Sundays.  The station is also served by DalesRail trains between Blackpool North/Preston and Carlisle on Sundays during the summer (one train each way in the summer 2019 timetable).

Statue of Ruswarp 

The southbound platform features a life-size bronze statue of a Border Collie dog named Ruswarp (pronounced ). Ruswarp belonged to Graham Nuttall, one of the founding members of the group that saved the Settle-Carlisle Railway from closure. The dog was featured in the campaign, signing the petition to save the line with a paw-print. Nuttall disappeared while walking with Ruswarp in the Welsh Mountains on 20 January 1990. His body was found on 7 April; Ruswarp was still alive after standing guard over his owner's body for 11 weeks and died shortly after attending the funeral. The sculpture by Joel Walker is a memorial to both Graham Nuttall, Ruswarp and the campaign to save the line from closure. It was unveiled on 11 April 2009, 20 years after the line was saved from closure. The station waiting rooms, previously out of use due to leaking roofs, were also refurbished and reopened to the public as part of the ceremony.

See also
 Listed buildings in Garsdale

References

External links

 
 

Railway stations in Cumbria
DfT Category F2 stations
Former Midland Railway stations
Railway stations in Great Britain opened in 1876
Railway stations in Great Britain closed in 1970
Railway stations in Great Britain opened in 1986
Reopened railway stations in Great Britain
Northern franchise railway stations
Dog monuments
Beeching closures in England
Wensleydale
John Holloway Sanders railway stations